Self-supporting ministers (SSMs), previously called non-stipendiary ministers or non-stipendiary priests (NSMs), are religious ministers who do not receive a stipend (i.e. payment) for their services and therefore financially support their own ministry. They usually have alternative employment which provides monetary income with which they can support themselves. There were around 2,000 SSMs in the Church of England at the turn of the 21st century and 3,230 in 2016.

Notable self-supporting ministers

 Sarah Mullally before becoming Bishop
 Andrew Burnham, former Bishop of Ebbsfleet
 Paula Vennells, CEO of the Post Office
 Guy Hewitt
 Lionel Fanthorpe
 Kate Bottley

References

Anglican ecclesiastical offices
Church of England